Federico Gentile (born 27 January 1985) is an Italian professional footballer who plays as a midfielder for Swiss club Chiasso.

Club career
On 2 November 2021, he joined Serie C club Seregno.

On 7 July 2022, Gentile signed with Chiasso in the third-tier Swiss Promotion League.

References

External links
 
 

1985 births
Living people
Footballers from Rome
Italian footballers
Association football midfielders
Serie C players
Serie D players
Swiss Promotion League players
Valenzana Mado players
A.S.D. Civitavecchia 1920 players
Pol. Alghero players
F.C. Aprilia Racing Club players
Celano F.C. Marsica players
Savona F.B.C. players
S.P.A.L. players
A.C.N. Siena 1904 players
Como 1907 players
Calcio Foggia 1920 players
Alma Juventus Fano 1906 players
U.S. 1913 Seregno Calcio players
FC Chiasso players
Italian expatriate footballers
Expatriate footballers in Switzerland
Italian expatriate sportspeople in Switzerland